is a Japanese actor and voice actor affiliated with  Mausu Promotion. Some of his major roles include Ryuzo in Cybuster, Dr. White in Black Jack 21, Nagato in Naruto: Shippuden, and BUER in Pandora in the Crimson Shell: Ghost Urn.

Filmography

Anime

Film

Video games

Tokusatsu

Dubbing roles

Live-action

Animation

References

External links
 
 

1954 births
Living people
Japanese male stage actors
Japanese male video game actors
Japanese male voice actors
Male voice actors from Fukuoka Prefecture
Mausu Promotion voice actors
20th-century Japanese male actors
21st-century Japanese male actors